Leopold Anton Johann Sigismund Josef Korsinus Ferdinand Graf Berchtold von und zu Ungarschitz, Frättling und Püllütz (18 April 1863 – 21 November 1942) was an Austro-Hungarian politician, diplomat and statesman who served as Imperial Foreign Minister at the outbreak of World War I.

Life

Career 
Born in Vienna on 18 April 1863 into a wealthy noble family that owned lands in Moravia and Hungary, he was reputed to be one of Austria-Hungary's richest men. Tutored at home, he later studied law and joined the Austro-Hungarian foreign service in 1893. In the same year, he married Countess Ferdinanda Károlyi (1868–1955), the daughter of one of the richest aristocrats in Hungary, in Budapest. He subsequently served at the embassies in Paris (1894), London (1899) and St. Petersburg (1903).

In December 1906, Count Berchtold was appointed as the successor of Count Lexa von Aehrenthal as Ambassador to Russia upon the latter's appointment as Imperial Foreign Minister. He served with distinction for five years in St. Petersburg and experienced Russia's distrust and fear of Vienna. In September 1908, he hosted a secret meeting between Aehrenthal and the Russian Foreign Minister Alexander Izvolsky at his estate at Buchlau in Moravia. This meeting produced the so-called Buchlau bargain and led to the Austro-Hungarian annexation of Bosnia and Herzegovina.

At the death of Aehrenthal in February 1912, Count Berchtold was appointed as his successor and thus became, at the age of 49, the youngest foreign minister in Europe. His appointment reportedly came against his own will and despite lack of experience in domestic affairs, as well as in military matters.

Balkan Wars 

As Imperial Foreign Minister, Count Berchtold focused almost exclusively on the Balkans where his foreign policy aims were to maintain peace, stick to the principle of non-intervention and preserve the territorial status quo. The Balkan Wars in 1912/1913, however, quickly made such a policy illusory.

At the outset of the Balkan Wars, Count Berchtold pursued a hard-line policy and flirted with the idea of war against Serbia, but vacillated and pulled back from intervention at the last moment. Although he managed to prevent Serbia from securing an outlet to the Adriatic Sea by support given to the creation of Albania, the Balkan Wars resulted in a failure to contain the rising Russian influence in the Balkans and thwart Serbian ambitions for a united Yugoslav state. It meant diplomatic defeat for Austria-Hungary and also a reputation of being weak and indecisive for Count Berchtold.

Count Berchtold's focus on Serbia was grown out of a fear of Serbian territorial expansion in the Balkans and also a complication of frictional matters within the multinational Dual Monarchy, and would eventually result in the dissolution of the empire itself.

July Crisis 
Following the Balkan Wars, the assassination of Archduke Franz Ferdinand at Sarajevo on 28 June 1914 was therefore a culmination of the heightened tension between Austria-Hungary and Serbia. If Count Berchtold had been accused of indecisiveness and diffidence during the Balkan Wars, he gave proof of more resolve during the July Crisis. Pushed by the so-called Young Rebels at the Ballhausplatz led by Count Hoyos, his chef de cabinet, Count Berchtold seized the opportunity to launch punitive action against Serbia and deal the country a mortal blow.

After having dispatched Count Hoyos on a mission to Berlin on 5 July to secure German support for Austria-Hungary's future actions, which resulted in the famous "blank cheque", he became the leading spokesman, together with the Chief of the General Staff General Conrad von Hötzendorf, for war against Serbia during the meeting of the Imperial Crown Council on 7 July. Through the moderating influence of the Hungarian Minister-President Count Tisza, who had reservations on the use of force against Serbia, it was decided to present Serbia with an ultimatum.  The ten-point ultimatum was presented to Emperor Franz Joseph on 21 July and transmitted to Belgrade on 23 July.  The previous night, according to his wife Nadine's testimony, Count Berchtold spent a sleepless night, altering the ultimatum and adding clauses, as he was very worried the Serbs could accept it. Serbian government accepted all points of the ultimatum but the one that permitted Austro-Hungarian authorities to participate in the investigation of the assassination on Serbian territory, which would have been a severe violation of Serbian sovereignty and the country's constitution. As the acceptance of all 10 demands listed in the ultimatum was required, the Austro-Hungarian government made a decision to enter a state of war with Serbia on 28 July, for which he was largely to blame.

World War I 

Once war had started, Count Berchtold focused his efforts on the question of Italy's participation, the outcome of which would lead to his downfall.  The main problem was Italy's demands for territorial compensation in exchange for remaining within the Triple Alliance.  When Rome presented the Ballhausplatz with demands for control over territories in southern Austria-Hungary, Berchtold demurred and refused to offer any Habsburg concessions, especially not in the Trentino.

However, Italian Foreign Minister Baron Sonnino succeeded in obtaining vague promises of compensations in South Tyrol from Germany and by the end of 1914, Count Berchtold informed the Crown Council that the choice was either acceptance of the Italian demands or a declaration of war.  Both Count Tisza and General Conrad von Hötzendorf expressed a preference for the latter. Under mounting German pressure, Count Berchtold, however, indicated that he was ready to cede the Trentino and parts of the Albanian coastline.  When he informed Tisza and Conrad of the concessions he was ready to give, they forced him to resign on 13 January 1915.  At Count Tisza's insistence he was replaced by the more pugnacious Count Burián.

Berchtold played no further public role during the war, although he was appointed Lord High Steward to Archduke Karl, the heir apparent, in March 1916, and became Lord Chamberlain following the latter's accession to the throne in November. 
Count Berchtold had been invested as a Knight of the Order of the Golden Fleece in 1912 and bestowed with the Grand Cross of the Order of Saint Stephen in 1914.

After the war, he retired as a grand seigneur on his estate at Peresznye near Csepreg in Hungary, where he died on 21 November 1942.  He was buried in the family tomb at Buchlau.

Legacy 
Count Berchtold was described at the time as "intelligent and hard-working" and possessed of a "great personal charm" that made him well-liked at court. Indeed, he possessed all the social graces required at the Hofburg and impressed with his aristocratic background. However he lacked the strength of character and broad experience that would have been desirable in an imperial foreign minister. This contributed to quick reversals of decisions, giving rise to a foreign policy often perceived as inconsistent and vacillating.

Many historians have regarded him as indecisive and diffident. However, during the July Crisis this appears not to have been the case as he "commanded and managed the process" on this occasion. His responsibility for the outbreak of the First World War has been much debated by historians. Without a doubt, he played a leading role in the intransigent formulation in the ultimatum of 23 July, the declaration of war on 28 July, and the rebuttal of Grey's mediation proposal on 29 July. He believed that only the defeat of Serbia could preserve the Dual Monarchy. Despite that, he was not thought of as a warmonger by, for example, General Conrad von Hötzendorf. At the same time, his lack of self-confidence at the helm of Austro-Hungarian diplomacy made him susceptible to persuasion by his pro-war staff at the Ballhausplatz, on whose advice and opinions he was heavily dependent.

Although Berchtold may have personally pushed for war, the main question is whether he appreciated that a war against Serbia carried the risk of a major European war. According to G. A. Tunstall Jr, "a Russian intervention doesn't seem to had been taken into much consideration by the Austro-Hungarian leaders during the decision-making process". In any case, "if he did not apprehend the consequences of his policies sufficiently, he was, however, not alone; as a matter of fact, there were few diplomats at the time who actually did".

In film and television 
Count Berchtold was portrayed by actor John Gielgud in the 1969 film Oh! What A Lovely War.

Awards
National orders and decorations
 Jubilee Court Medal (1898)
 Bronze Jubilee Medal for the Armed Forces (1898)
 Jubilee Cross for Civil Officials (1908)
 Grand Cross of the Imperial Order of Leopold, 1908; in Diamonds, 1911
 Knight of the Golden Fleece, 1912
 Grand Cross of St. Stephen, 1914; in Diamonds, 1915
 Military Merit Cross, 3rd Class with War Decoration, 1915

Foreign orders and decorations

See also
 Austro-Hungarian entry into World War I

Notes

References

Further reading 
 Austro-Hungarian Monarchy.  Austro-Hungarian red book. (1915) English translations of official documents to justify the war. online
 Godsey, William D., and William D. Godsey Jr. Aristocratic redoubt: The Austro-Hungarian foreign office on the eve of the First World War (Purdue University Press, 1999).
 Gooch, G. P. Before The War Vol II  (1939) pp 373–447 on Berchtold online free, scholarly biography
 Hantsch, Hugo. Leopold Graf Berchtold: Grandseigneur und Staatsmann, Graz, Verlag Styria, 1963, in German.
 Wank, Solomon. "The Appointment of Count Berchtold as Austro-Hungarian Foreign Minister" Journal of Central European Affairs 23 (July 1963): 143–51. 
 Williamson, Jr.,  Samuel. "Leopold Count Berchtold: The Man Who Could Have Prevented the Great War," in Günther Bischof, Fritz Plasser and Peter Berger, eds., From Empire to Republic: Post-World War I Austria, Contemporary Austrian Studies, Vol. 19 (2010), p. 24-51.

External links 

 'Berchtold, Leopold Anton Johann Sigismund Joseph Korsinus Ferdinand Graf', Neue Deutsche Biographie
 'Berchtold, Leopold Graf', AEIOU
 'Graf Leopold Berchtold von und zu Ungarschütz, Frättling, und Püllütz', Solving Problems Through Force
 'Count Leopold von Berchtold', firstworldwar.com
 Count Leopold von Berchtold in Ludwig Thallóczy's diary
 
 Primary Sources on Berchtold during the July Crisis
 Samuel R. Williamson, Jr.: Berchtold, Leopold Graf, in: 1914-1918-online. International Encyclopedia of the First World War.
 

1863 births
1942 deaths
Austro-Hungarian diplomats of World War I
Foreign ministers of Austria-Hungary
Austrian politicians
Austrian diplomats
Counts of Austria
Hungarian nobility
Moravian nobility
Leopold
Czech people of Austrian descent
Hungarian people of Austrian descent
Knights of the Golden Fleece of Austria
Grand Crosses of the Order of Saint Stephen of Hungary
Recipients of the Order of Bravery, 2nd class
Recipients of the Military Merit Order (Bavaria)
Chevaliers of the Légion d'honneur
Bailiffs Grand Cross of Honour and Devotion of the Sovereign Military Order of Malta
Knights Grand Cross of the Order of Pope Pius IX
Recipients of the Iron Cross (1914), 2nd class
Grand Crosses of the Order of the Crown (Romania)
Grand Crosses of the Order of Saint-Charles
Obersthofmeister